Vorotnaberd (also Davit Bek's Castle) is an important fortress along a ridge overlooking the Vorotan gorge, between the villages of Vaghatin and Vorotan in the Syunik Province of Armenia.

History 
Vorotnaberd was destroyed multiple times by foreign invasions. Ivane Zakaryan liberated the structures from enemy hands and gave control of Vorotnavank and Vorotnaberd to Liparit Orbelian of the Orbelyan family. Repairs were made to the nearby monastery during this time to make it functional once again.

Other foreign invasions included the Mongol-Tatars (in 1236?) and later Timur Lenk in 1386 where his army lay siege to the fortress.  An underground passageway connected to Vorotnavank and the Vorotan River was used during sieges by invading armies.

In 1724 Davit Bek took control of Vorotnaberd from Melik Baghri.  This incident led people living in the region to call the fortress by the name "Davit Bek's Castle".

Architecture 
The fortress is in ruin.

References

External links 
 Armeniapedia.org: Որոտանաբերդ (Article in Armenian)

Archaeological sites in Armenia
Castles in Armenia
Forts in Armenia
Tourist attractions in Syunik Province
Buildings and structures in Syunik Province